Frederik Nielsen and Joe Salisbury were the defending champions but chose not to defend their title.

Santiago González and Aisam-ul-Haq Qureshi won the title after defeating Gong Maoxin and Zhang Ze 4–6, 7–6(7–5), [10–5] in the final.

Seeds

Draw

References

External links 
 Main draw

Nottingham Open - Men's Doubles
2019 Men's Doubles
2019 Nottingham Open